Hank Steinbrecher (born 1947) is an American former soccer executive, player, and coach. He is a member of the National Soccer Hall of Fame.

Early career
Steinbrecher attended Davis & Elkins College, where he was a member of the school's 1970 NAIA national championship soccer team. He graduated from Davis & Elkins, then earned a master's degree in education from West Virginia University.

He began his coaching career at Warren Wilson College, where he served as head soccer coach and athletic director. He then coached the Appalachian State Mountaineers from 1978 to 1980, leading the team to three consecutive Southern Conference championships. He coached at Boston University from 1980 to 1984. From 1985 to 1990, he was the director of sports marketing for Quaker Oats Company.

U.S. Soccer
On November 5, 1990, Steinbrecher became the Secretary General of the United States Soccer Federation. He took a lead role in marketing the sport and was directly involved in developing U.S. Soccer's sponsorship programs. He also oversaw the staging of the 1994 FIFA World Cup, the 1996 Summer Olympics Soccer Tournament, and the 1999 FIFA Women's World Cup. He stepped down from his position in February 2000.

Accolades
Steinbrecher was inducted into the National Soccer Hall of Fame as a builder in 2005. In 2012, he received the Werner Fricker Builder Award, which honors those "who have established a lasting legacy in the history and structure of soccer in the United States."

He is also a member of the New England Soccer Hall of Fame, the Eastern New York Soccer Hall of Fame, and the North Carolina Soccer Hall of Fame.

The Hank Steinbrecher Cup is a USASA competition started in 2013 that crowns the National Amateur Champions.

References

External links
 National Soccer Hall of Fame bio

1947 births
Living people
American soccer coaches
Appalachian State Mountaineers men's soccer coaches
Boston University Terriers men's soccer coaches
United States Soccer Federation officials
Davis & Elkins Senators men's soccer players
National Soccer Hall of Fame members
Warren Wilson Owls men's soccer coaches
Association footballers not categorized by position
Association football players not categorized by nationality